The Viking Helgi is a Dmitriy Furmanov-class (project 302, BiFa129M) Soviet/Russian river cruise ship, cruising in the Volga – Neva basin. The ship was built by VEB Elbewerften Boizenburg/Roßlau at their shipyard in Boizenburg, East Germany, and entered service in 1984 as Aleksey Surkov being renamed after Oleg of Novgorod in its Scandinavian version Helgi in 2012.

Viking Helgi sails under Russian flag. Her home port is currently Saint Petersburg.

See also
 List of river cruise ships

References

External links

Viking Helgi Cruise ship –Viking River Cruises

1984 ships
River cruise ships
Ships built in East Germany
Passenger ships of the Soviet Union
Passenger ships of Russia